Shirley is a town in Middlesex County, Massachusetts, United States. It is approximately thirty miles west-northwest of Boston. The population was 7,431 at the 2020 census. The town has a well-preserved historic New England town center.

It is home to the Massachusetts Correctional Institution – Shirley, a medium-security state prison. (The neighboring maximum-security Souza-Baranowski Correctional Center lies just outside the town limits in the town of Lancaster.)  The remains of a Shaker village have been preserved within the grounds of the prison.

History 

The inhabitants at the time of European encounter were Nipmuc (or Pennacook) Indians, who called the area Catacunemaug. Once part of "The Plantation of Groton," Shirley was first settled by English pioneers about 1720.

In 1753 it separated from Groton and was incorporated, named in honor of William Shirley, governor of Massachusetts (1741–1757). The town established a paper mill around 1790, and the first of seven cotton mills in 1812. Other local products included iron, nails, textiles, rope, belts, suspenders, and athletic equipment. Two of the large 19th-century mill buildings have been subdivided and adapted for use by 21st-century businesses.

A utopian religious community, Shirley Shaker Village, was established in Shirley in 1793. The Shakers advocated pacifism, common property, celibacy, and communal living. They are renowned for their plain architecture and furniture. The Shaker movement peaked in the 1840s, but gradually dwindled, perhaps because of greater employment opportunities offered by the Industrial Revolution, or because succeeding generations grew less tolerant of the Shaker church's insistence on self-abnegation. Shirley Shaker Village closed in 1908.

A medium-security state prison was built on land surrounding the remains of the Shaker village in Shirley, and continues to operate. The town also operates a Senior Center located at 9 Parker Road, which previously was a preschool/kindergarten.

Geography
The town has a total area of 15.9 square miles (41.2 km), of which 15.8 square miles (41.0 km) is land and 0.1 square mile (0.2 km) (0.50%) is water. It is bounded by the Squannacook and Nashua rivers and contains Mulpus Brook and Catecunemaug Brook.  Significant wetlands are Spruce Swamp (drained by Spruce Swamp Brook) and Tophet Swamp.

Demographics

This article describes the town of Shirley as a whole. Additional demographic detail is available which describes only the central settlement or village within the town, although that detail is included in the aggregate values reported here. See: Shirley (CDP), Massachusetts.

As of the census of 2000, there were 6,373 people, 2,067 households, and 1,426 families residing in the town. The racial makeup of the town was 83.90% White, 6.72% Black or African American, 0.47% Native American, 2.10% Asian, 0.08% Pacific Islander, 5.12% from other races, and 1.62% from two or more races. Hispanic or Latino of any race were 6.86% of the population.

There were 2,067 households, out of which 34.2% had children under the age of 18 living with them, 56.2% were married couples living together, 9.3% had a female householder with no husband present, and 31.0% were non-families. 25.4% of all households were made up of individuals, and 8.7% had someone living alone who was 65 years of age or older. The average household size was 2.55 and the average family size was 3.09.

In the town, the population was spread out, with 21.7% under the age of 18, 7.6% from 18 to 24, 39.2% from 25 to 44, 22.3% from 45 to 64, and 9.2% who were 65 years of age or older. The median age was 37 years. For every 100 females, there were 137.8 males. For every 100 females age 18 and over, there were 151.8 males.

The median income for a household in the town was $53,344, and the median income for a family was $66,250. Males had a median income of $42,078 versus $32,130 for females. The per capita income for the town was $20,556. About 1.9% of families and 3.3% of the population were below the poverty line, including 2.1% of those under age 18 and 4.4% of those age 65 or over.

Schools
Lura A. White Elementary School
Ayer Shirley Regional Middle School
Ayer Shirley Regional High School
A new regional school system shared with the neighboring Town of Ayer officially launched in 2011

Parks
 Benjamin Hill Recreation Area
 Fredonian Nature Center
 Whitley Park
 Farandnear Reservation

Points of interest

 Shirley Historical Society Museum
 Shirley Shaker Village
 Massachusetts Correctional Institution – Shirley, a medium/minimum security state prison.
 Shirley Senior Center
 Shirley Meeting House
 Storybook Cottage.  Stan Jurga writes, "Storybook Cottage is the creation of my father-in-law, Dave Holden. Dave purchase the property quite a few years back from his relatives and began the renovation. At the time we had Tom Fleming, an exceptional artist renting space from us in the President building. Dave befriended Tom and commissioned him to create the storybook figures and signs on the building. Dave and Tom are no longer with us but what they left behind still brings lots of joy to many. Storybook is private property currently owned by my wife Carol and her two brothers and sister."
 Hazen Memorial Library

Transportation
Commuter rail service from Boston's North Station is provided by the MBTA with a stop in Shirley on its Fitchburg Line. The Montachusett Regional Transit Authority (MART) supplies Councils-On-Aging service for elderly and disabled residents.

Media

Newspapers
 Nashoba Valley Voice (previously Shirley Oracle) 
 Fitchburg Sentinel & Enterprise
 The Lowell Sun
 Worcester Telegram & Gazette
 The Shirley Volunteer (no longer published)

Cable
 Shirley Public Access Corporation

Notable people
 Simon Atherton, shaker 
 Clara Bancroft Beatley, educator, lecturer and author
 Oliver Holden, hymn writer
 Benton MacKaye, forester who proposed the Appalachian Trail
 Sarah Carter Edgarton Mayo, writer and editor
 Daniel Parker (general), inspector general, adjutant general and postmaster general
 Earl Tupper, founder of Tupperware company
 Jerry White, former Major League Baseball player

Notes

References
 The source for Shirley's coordinates is   The 1990 Gazetteer was consulted and the value given for the zip code 01464 was used: 42.558653 N, 71.646444 W.

Further reading
 History of the Town of Shirley, Massachusetts, by Seth Chandler, published 1883, 744 pages.
 
 
  Seth Chandler Biography, by Alan Seaburg, Published 2011, Anne Miniver Press

Maps
 1871 Atlas of Massachusetts. by Wall & Gray.
 Map of Massachusetts.
 Map of Middlesex County.

See also
 Shirley Center Historic District
 Shirley Village Historic District

External links

 Town of Shirley official website
 Massachusetts official website – Town of Shirley

 
Towns in Middlesex County, Massachusetts
Towns in Massachusetts